WVFP-LP (94.7 FM) was a radio station licensed to Gainesville, Florida, United States. The station was owned by Faith Presbyterian Church of Gainesville. WVFP shared this frequency with WGLJ-LP, owned by Calvary Chapel Gainesville, and previously with WGOT-LP, owned by the Civic Media Center.

On August 1, 2019, the church requested cancellation of the station's license, stating that as of that writing, they had not operated "WVFP-LP for at least two years minimum."

References

External links
 

VFP-LP
VFP-LP
Defunct religious radio stations in the United States
Defunct radio stations in the United States
VFP-LP